Anvar Khāmahʼī (20 March 1917 – 20 November 2018) was an Iranian sociologist, economist, journalist, and politician, who wrote many books in his specialty fields, including his analytical and critical book Revisionism from Marx to Mao Tse-Tung. Khamei gained his B.Sc. in sociology and his Ph.D. in economics from the Heidelberg University and the University of Freiburg, respectively. In addition, he held a M.Sc. degree in journalism. He was a university professor at the University of Louvain (UCLouvain) in Belgium, and a UNESCO fellow. Khamei was an activist of the Tudeh Party of Iran in the 1940s, but he quit in January 1948, and concentrated on his journalistic and academic activities. He believed in social democracy, or in other words, the Third Way, for the most of his life. Khamei was a multilinguist, being proficient in German, French, and English languages, in addition to his mother tongue Persian language, with many publications in all those languages. He died on 20 November 2018 at the age of 101 from respiratory failure. He was a descendant of Fath-Ali Shah Qajar.

See also
From No. 37

References

External links
Anvar Khamei on WorldCat
Anvar Khāmahʼī on WorldCat

1917 births
2018 deaths
Iranian sociologists
Iranian economists
Iranian journalists
Tudeh Party of Iran members
Iranian centenarians
Iranian male writers
Iranian memoirists
Iranian translators
Men centenarians